Bright Sunny South is an album by Sam Amidon released May 14, 2013, by Nonesuch Records The album was recorded at Snap Recording Studios and Livington Studios in London. Amidon, his friend Thomas Bartlett (a.k.a. Doveman), and Jerry Boys produced the album. Amidon sings and performs banjo, fiddle, acoustic guitar, and piano on the album. Bartlett performs several instruments, as do Shahzad Ismaily and Chris Vatalaro; Kenny Wheeler performs trumpet on two tracks.

Bright Sunny South includes interpretations of both traditional and contemporary songs, like Tim McGraw’s “My Old Friend” and Mariah Carey’s “Shake It Off," as well as a new take on “Weeping Mary,” a shape-note hymn that his parents, Peter and Mary Alice Amidon, had recorded with the Word of Mouth Chorus for Nonesuch Records on the 1977 album Rivers of Delight: American Folk Hymns from the Sacred Harp Tradition. NPR's Morning Edition host Steve Inskeep describes Bright Sunny South as "a new spin on very traditional American folk music."

Background and recording

Legendary jazz trumpet player Kenny Wheeler appears on two songs on the record, one of his last recorded appearances before his death in 2014.

Track listing

Personnel
 Sam Amidon – voice, banjo, fiddle, acoustic guitar, piano
 Thomas Bartlett – piano, Hammond organ, Wurlitzer, Moog synthesizer, percussion, electric guitar
 Shahzad Ismaily – electric & acoustic guitars, electric bass, Moog bass, drum, shaker egg
 Chris Vatalaro – drums & percussion, flute, Wurlitzer
 Kenny Wheeler – trumpet 
 Doug Wieselman – clarinet  
 Tyler Gibbons – electric bass

References

2013 albums
Sam Amidon albums
Nonesuch Records albums